Uolba is a rural locality (a selo), the only inhabited locality, and the administrative center of Uolbinsky Rural Okrug of Tattinsky District in the Sakha Republic, Russia, located  from Ytyk-Kyuyol, the administrative center of the district. Its population as of the 2010 Census was 536, of whom 270 were male and 266 female, up from 532 as recorded during the 2002 Census.

Geography
Uolba is located in a flat area by river Tatta.

References

Notes

Sources
Official website of the Sakha Republic. Registry of the Administrative-Territorial Divisions of the Sakha Republic. Tattinsky District. 

Rural localities in Tattinsky District